The Teviot Falls is a plunge waterfall in the Darling Downs region of Queensland, Australia.

Location and features

The falls descend  from the McPherson Range near Wilsons Peak, north of the Queensland/New South Wales border. The falls may be viewed via accessing a sealed road up the range towards Teviot Gap, also known as The Head.

Four other waterfalls are located in the area surrounding Killarney, including the Queen Mary Falls, Daggs Falls, Browns Falls and Upper Browns Falls.

Etymology
The naming of the falls is derived from the naming of Teviot Brook on 6 August 1828 by Allan Cunningham, a botanist and explorer, after the River Teviot, Roxburghshire, Scotland.

See also

 List of waterfalls of Queensland
Wyaralong Dam

References

Waterfalls of Queensland
Darling Downs
Plunge waterfalls